The 2021 Vanderbilt Commodores football team represented Vanderbilt University in the 2021 NCAA Division I FBS football season. The Commodores played their home games at Vanderbilt Stadium in Nashville, Tennessee and competed in the Eastern Division of the Southeastern Conference (SEC). They were led by first-year head coach Clark Lea.

Previous season

The 2020 team finished the COVID-19 shortened season with a record of 0–9 with an all-SEC schedule, finishing in last place in the East Division. Head coach Derek Mason was fired on November 29 following a 0–41 loss to Missouri; offensive coordinator Todd Fitch served as the team's interim head coach for the season finale against Tennessee.

Staff

Schedule

Roster

Game summaries

East Tennessee State

Statistics

at Colorado State

Statistics

Stanford

Statistics

No. 2 Georgia

Statistics

UConn

Statistics

at No. 20 Florida

Statistics

at South Carolina

Statistics

Mississippi State

Statistics

Missouri

Statistics

Kentucky

Statistics

at No. 12 Ole Miss

Statistics

at Tennessee

Statistics

References

Vanderbilt
Vanderbilt Commodores football seasons
Vanderbilt Commodores football